Skënder Ahmet Halili (born 20 August 1940 – 13 December 1982) was an Albanian football player who played for 17 Nëntori, Dinamo and the Albania national team.

Club career
Halili played for Dinamo Tirana from December 1959 until December 1961, when he was suspended for a year after he wanted to, but was not allowed to, leave Dinamo.

International career
He made his debut for Albania in a June 1963 Olympic Games qualification match against Bulgaria and earned a total of 11 caps, scoring no goals. His final international was a November 1965 FIFA World Cup qualification match against Northern Ireland.

Personal life
In 1966, he was arrested and imprisoned for 11 months for allegedly doing business on the black market en later sent to work in the copper mines. It automatically meant his playing career finished at 26. He died in December 1982 from a serious illness.

Honours 
Dinamo
Albanian National Championship (1): 1960

17 Nëntori
Albanian National Championship (2): 1964–65, 1965–66
Republic Cup (1): 1962–63

References

External links

1940 births
1982 deaths
Footballers from Tirana
Albanian footballers
Association football central defenders
Albania international footballers
FK Dinamo Tirana players
KF Tirana players
Prisoners and detainees of Albania